Granice may refer to:

Granice, Łódź Voivodeship (central Poland)
Granice, Lublin Voivodeship (east Poland)
Granice, Masovian Voivodeship (east-central Poland)
Granice, Gmina Trzcinica in Greater Poland Voivodeship (west-central Poland)
Granice, Lubusz Voivodeship (west Poland)
Dyminy-Granice, Poland
Granice, Busovača, Bosnia and Herzegovina
Granice (Mladenovac), Serbia

See also
Granica (disambiguation)
Granitsa (disambiguation)